Terrence Lee Drisdom (born July 30, 1992) is an American professional basketball player.

Drisdom played college basketball at Cal Poly Pomona. He was named the CCAA Player of the Year as a senior after averaging 15.8 points, 6.0 rebounds, 2.6 assists and 2.4 steals per game.

For the 2018–19 season, Drisdom signed with the Memphis Hustle of the NBA G League. He was waived by the Hustle on December 7, 2018 after appearing in five games.

In the summers of 2016 and 2017, Drisdom played in The Basketball Tournament on ESPN for Team Utah (Utah Alumni). He competed for the $2 million prize, and for Team Utah in 2017, he averaged 21 points per game and shot 81 percent behind the free-throw line. Drisdom helped take Team Utah to the second round of the tournament, where they lost to team Few Good Men (Gonzaga Alumni) by a score of 85–83.

References

External links
 Terrence Drisdom at RealGM

1992 births
Living people
American expatriate basketball people in Japan
American expatriate basketball people in Mexico
American men's basketball players
Basketball players from California
Cal Poly Pomona Broncos men's basketball players
Delaware Blue Coats players
Hiroshima Dragonflies players
Huracanes de Tampico players
Memphis Hustle players
Rayos de Hermosillo players
Santa Cruz Warriors players
Shooting guards
Sportspeople from Corona, California